Supercars Life is an Australian television series based on the Supercars Championship that airs on Fox Sports.

Format
The series features a combination of behind-the-scenes footage, interviews and off-track features. This includes fly on the wall footage of team operations on a race weekend as well as features on the personal lives of drivers away from the track. In each episode, a different selection of teams or drivers from the Supercars Championship are featured. Twenty episodes were produced in 2015, spread throughout the year in conjunction with the 2015 championship. Twenty further episodes were commissioned for the series' second season in 2016. In 2017, the series extended to one hour episodes, at the same time reducing from 20 to 13 episodes in the year.

The show is produced by AME Management, with the support of Fox Sports. AME had in 2014 produced a similar series for 7mate, V8 Life. As opposed to the wider focus of Inside Supercars, the six episodes of V8 Life solely focused on the operations of the Holden Racing Team.

History
In late 2013 it was announced that Fox Sports, in a shared deal with Network Ten, had acquired the broadcast rights for the series, that was then known as V8 Supercars, as of the 2015 season. To accompany their new coverage of the category, in early 2015 Fox Sports launched both this series as well as the panel-based discussion series Inside Supercars. Supercars Life was first aired on 26 March 2015, in the build-up to the second event of the 2015 season; the Tyrepower Tasmania Super Sprint. The inaugural episode featured the Triple Eight Race Engineering and Prodrive Racing Australia rivalry at the 2015 Clipsal 500 Adelaide, including interviews with team principals Roland Dane and Tim Edwards, as well as a feature on Scott McLaughlin. The series also featured these two teams for their coverage of the 2015 Supercheap Auto Bathurst 1000, providing an insight into the key race strategies and decisions for both teams. The series' first episode in 2016 featured a season preview as well as a feature on Will Davison and his friendship with 2016 Dakar Rally winner Toby Price. As of Season 2, episodes are also repeated in New Zealand on Sky Sport. The third season once again opened with a championship preview, with the series also to include features on former champions Russell Ingall and Mark Skaife.

In 2018 and 2019, Supercars Life segments were embedded into race weekend broadcasts rather than airing as separate programmes. From 2019 segments were uploaded to the Fox Sports-owned streaming service Kayo Sports. In 2020, the show returned in a dedicated timeslot with seven dedicated episodes scheduled on Fox Sports and Kayo.

Episodes

Season 1

Season 2

See also

 List of Australian television series
 List of longest-running Australian television series

References

Fox Sports (Australian TV network) original programming
2014 Australian television series debuts
Automotive television series
Australian sports television series
Motorsport in Australia
English-language television shows
Supercars Championship